This article lists the squads and players who competed in the 1996 European Women's Handball Championship played in Denmark.

Austria
 Sylvia Kundt 
 Beate Hofmann
 Laura Fritz
 Ruth Swoboda
 Annamaria Ur
 Tatyana Dzhandzhagava
 Sylvia Strass 
 Rima Sypkuviene 
 Stephanie Ofenböck
 Edith Török 
 Sorina Lefter 
 Ausra Ziukiene 
 Edith Mika 
 Stanca Bozovic 
 Iris Morhammer 
 Barbara Strass

Croatia
 Ljerka Krajnovic
 Irina Maljko
 Klaudija Klikovac-Bubalo 
 Marija Celina
 Helena Lulic
 Renata Damjanic 
 Vlatka Mihoci 
 Danijela Tuda
 Andrea Hrg
 Natasa Kolega
 Koraljka Milic
 Elena Nemaskalo 
 Snjezana Petika 
 Bozica Greguric

Denmark

Germany
 Michaela Schanze
 Christine Lindemann 
 Miroslava Ritskiavitchius 
 Emilia Luca
 Grit Jurack 
 Manuela Fiedel
 Annika Schafferus
 Andrea Bölk 
 Michaela Erler 
 Kathrin Blacha 
 Franziska Heinz 
 Eva Kiss-Györi 
 Melanie Schliecker

Hungary
 Beáta Hoffmann
 Andrea Farkas
 Anikó Meksz
 Klára Kertész
 Gabriella Takács
 Rita Borók
 Eszter Mátéfi
 Éva Szarka
 Andrea Nagy
 Erzsébet Kocsis
 Beatrix Tóth
 Beáta Siti
 Éva Erdős
 Anasztázia Virincsik
 Anita Kulcsár
 Beatrix Balogh

Lithuania
 Aurika Celesiene
 Jurata Jankaitiene
 Margarita Daublyte
 Ingrida Ramonaite
 Jurga Banislauskaite
 Elena Berciuniene 
 Reda Urbonaviciene 
 Ruta Biziene
 Gitane Miseikiene 
 Ingrida Radzeviciute 
 Ausra Seselskyte 
 Lina Spalviene 
 Larisa Pavoliene

Norway
 Heidi Marie Tjugum
 Annette Skotvoll
 Jeanette Nilsen 
 Tonje Larsen
 Kjersti Grini 
 Kristine Duvholt Havnas 
 Susann Goksör Bjerkrheim 
 Kari Solem Aune 
 Sahra Hausmann 
 Mette Davidsen 
 Trine Haltvik 
 Kristine Moldestad
 Monica Vik Hansen
 Janne Tuven
 Ellen Mitchell
 Silje Bolset

Poland
 Iwona Pabich
 Magdalena Chemicz
 Agnieszka Zienkiewicz
 Iwona Budzynska
 Izabela Kowalewska
 Agnieszka Truszynska 
 Iwona Nabozna 
 Anna Garwacka
 Malgorzata Jedrzejczak 
 Izabela Czapko 
 Renata Zukiel 
 Sabina Soja 
 Anna Ejsmont 
 Aleksandra Pawelska 
 Ewa Szelag

Romania
 Carmen Moldovan-Petca 
 Olimpia Veres
 Ildiko Kerekes
 Valentina Cozma 
 Petronela Melinte 
 Lidia Draganescu 
 Lacramioara Pintelei 
 Corina Schiopu
 Mariana Tirca 
 Marinela Patru 
 Mihaela Apostol 
 Alina-Ileana Jula 
 Mihaela Bobocea 
 Roxana Gheorghiu 
 Luminita Stroe

Russia
 Stella Vartanian
 Natalia Gontcharova
 Nigina Saidova
 Natalya Deriouguina 
 Marina Chernovalenko 
 Natalia Boudarina
 Olga Evtcherenko 
 Irina Kalinichenko
 Raissa Verakso 
 Svetlana Mozgovaya 
 Irina Poletaeva 
 Nadezhda Konnova
 Natalia Malakhova 
 Inna Volkova

Sweden
 Kristina Ström
 Kristina Jönsson
 Theresa Claesson
 Sara Tilly
 Ulrika Karlsson
 Gunilla Olsson 
 Helen Benjaminsson
 Karin Nilsson 
 Veronica Isaksson 
 Lina Olsson 
 Cecilia Aagren 
 Madelene Olsson
 Kristina Olson 
 Asa Elisabeth Eriksson

Ukraine
 Larysa Zaspa
 Svitlana Morozova
 Ganna Kryvoruchko
 Larissa Kouzmenko 
 Nataliya Derepasko 
 Irina Magripova 
 Olena Yatsenko
 Tetiana Brabinko-Salogub
 Nataliya Martynienko 
 Tetyana Novikova 
 Inna Dolgun 
 Liliya Stolpakova
 Maryna Vergelyuk 
 Natalia Datsenko

References

European Handball Championship squads